Jarmila Pátková (born 9 June 1953) is a Czech rower. She competed in the women's quadruple sculls event at the 1976 Summer Olympics.

References

1953 births
Living people
Czech female rowers
Olympic rowers of Czechoslovakia
Rowers at the 1976 Summer Olympics
Sportspeople from Brno